The Women's Baseball Asian Cup is the main competition for national teams of Asia in women's baseball.

History
The World Baseball Softball Confederation announced in May 2017, that the first Women's Baseball Asian Cup will be held in Hong Kong within the same year. The tournament is to be hosted every two years and will serve as the Asian qualifiers for the Women's Baseball World Cup. Japan despite fielding only players under-18 years old, clinched the inaugural title.

Results

Medal table

Participating nations

References

 
Recurring sporting events established in 2017
International baseball competitions in Asia
Asian Cup
Asian championships